Honeywell can refer to:

Honeywell, an American multinational corporation 
Mark C. Honeywell, founder of Honeywell
Honeywell 200, a computer by Honeywell
Honeywell 316, a computer by Honeywell
Honeywell 6000 series, a computer by Honeywell
Honeywell LTS101, a turbofan engine by Honeywell
Honeywell TFE731, a turboshaft engine by Honeywell 
Honeywell Center, an admin center of Honeywell's
Honeywell Uranium Hexafluoride Processing Facility, a uranium conversion facility of Honeywell's
Honeywell project, an organisation to convince Honeywell to stop manufacturing weapons
Honeywell Group, a Nigerian conglomerate
Honeywell v. Sperry Rand, a US court case involving Honeywell Corp
Honeywell, South Yorkshire, a village in the UK
Frank Honeywell, a US author
Martha Ann Honeywe'', a US artist
Sarah-Jane Honeywell, a UK television presenter
Honeywell (band), a hardcore punk band that helped pioneer the screamo genre of music

See also
Honnywill (disambiguation)